Avigliana (Piedmontese: Vijan-a ; French : Veillane) is a town and comune (municipality) in the Metropolitan City of Turin in the Piedmont region or Italy, with 12,129 inhabitants as of January 1, 2023.

It is best known for two maar lakes, Lago Grande and Lago Piccolo. Also nearby is the massive Sacra di San Michele.

History

In 574, the Lombard King Cleph built a castle here. According to some sources, the battle between the Franks of Pippin the Younger and the Lombards of Aistulf occurred in the nearby in 750. Later Avigliana depended from the Abbey of Novalesa, and subsequently it was a possession of the House of Savoy.

Avigliana was captured by Emperor Henry VI in 1187, but later it was acquired by Thomas I of Savoy. In 1536, in the course of the Italian Wars, it was again stormed by French troops. French attacks repeated in 1630 and 1690, the latter ending with the destruction of the castle.

Main sights
 Ruins of the castle, destroyed in the seventeenth century by the French.
 Church of San Giovanni, with several works by Defendente Ferrari.
 The Romanesque church of San Pietro.
 Natural Park of the Lakes of Avigliana.

Transportation
Avigliana has two exits on the A32 Bardonecchia-Turin motorway. It has also a station on the Turin-Modane railroad.

Twin towns
  Tresserve, France
  Oualia, Mali
  Sevan, Armenia

References

External links
 
 Official website

Castles in Italy
Maars of Italy